Volusianus was bishop of Trier at the end of the 5th century.

Very little is known of his life but he is one of a number of bishops around this time. The rapid succession of bishops named in the late 5th and early 6th centuries indicates the troubled times in the period of transition from the Roman to Frankish rule in Trier, which was itself Frankish by 496.

After a period of crisis for the Christian community some stabilisation had apparently occurred under his predecessors.

Volusianus has been associated with the so-called New Year's Privilege, referring to the grant by Pope Sylvester I (314-335) of certain privileges to the church in Trier, although some question the authenticity of such a grant.

Where Volusianus was buried is unknown.

References

Gallo-Roman saints
Saints of Germania
Year of birth unknown
Year of death unknown
5th-century Christian saints
5th-century Frankish bishops
Roman Catholic bishops of Trier